Progress and Perfection is a promo album by Swiss electronic duo Yello, released on 21 September 2007. It was not released on a label, and was distributed by Audi officials on special events. The record was limited to 350 copies. Only the first two tracks have vocals; the others are instrumentals.

Track listing

Personnel
Lyrics By, Vocals – Dieter Meier (tracks: 1, 2) 
Music By, Arranged By, Engineer – Boris Blank 
Producer – Yello

References

2007 albums
Yello albums